Lyne Lake is a lake in Thunder Bay District, Ontario, Canada. The primary inflows are the Whitesand River, flowing downstream from Hornblende Lake, as well as Ross Creek, and the outflow is the Whitesand River downstream to the river's mouth at Whitesand Lake.

References

Lakes of Thunder Bay District